Avalau is an islet within the atoll of Funafuti, Tuvalu. Charles Hedley described Avalau in 1896 "this islet is said to possess a spring of fresh water".

References

Islands of Tuvalu
Pacific islands claimed under the Guano Islands Act
Funafuti